Paul Steiner was a volapükist from Nuremberg, Germany (although some other sources claim that he was a high school teacher in Saverne. He was active in the Volapük movement, but at one point quit and in 1885 created his own constructed language, Pasilingua.

References
 Spielmann, Sigmund. 1887. Volapük-Almanach für 1888, verfasst von Sigmund Spielmann. I. Jahrgang. Lekaled volapüka plo yel balmil jöltum jölsejöl, pelautöl fa Spielmann Sigmund. Yelüp balid. Leipzig: Mayer. (Vödem rigädik.)

Constructed language creators
Year of death missing
Year of birth missing